Felix Francis (born 1953) is a British crime writer. He is Dick Francis’ younger son.

Felix studied physics and electronics at London University, and then started a 17-year career teaching Advanced Level physics at three schools, the last seven as head of the science department at Bloxham School in Oxfordshire, before quitting to look after his father's affairs. He lives in Oxfordshire. From 1993 to 2005, he was a director and deputy chairman of World Challenge Expeditions Ltd. Felix is also a former governor of Winchester House Prep School, and is a governor of Malvern College.

Dick's wife, Mary Francis, assisted with both the research and the writing of many of Dick's novels until her death in 2000. Felix assisted with this, and after Mary died Felix took over her work. Felix and his father often worked together on plot and character details at Dick’s home in the Cayman Islands. This partnership allowed Dick to draw upon Felix’s knowledge and experience as a physics teacher in Twice Shy and his past as an international marksman in Shattered (2000) and Under Orders (2006).

With the publication of Dead Heat in 2007, Felix took on a more significant role in writing, and was credited as co-author. Silks (2008) was the second novel in this father-and-son collaboration, and Even Money (2009) was the third. Crossfire (2010) was the novel Dick and Felix were working on when Dick died in February 2010.

Felix's first novel written without his father was Gamble, published in September 2011, beginning the "Dick Francis novel" franchise.

Critical response
Kirkus said Gamble was "fully worthy of the family name", familiar to Dick Francis fans, but well-handled. Eurocrime gave a mixed review to Gamble, commenting on Felix's lack of direct experience of horseracing, criticizing "a curious flatness" in its narration, but calling it "a nicely layered, slightly complex thriller".

Novels

References

1953 births
Living people
British crime fiction writers